General Sir Henry Wyndham KCB (12 May 1790 – 3 August 1860) was a British Army General and Conservative Party politician.   He was Member of Parliament (MP) for Cockermouth from 1852 to 1857 and for West Cumberland from 1857 until his death in 1860.

Wyndham was the second son of George Wyndham, 3rd Earl of Egremont (1751–1837) and his mistress Elizabeth Ilive (died 1822), of Petworth House, near Chichester, West Sussex, and a descendant of John Wyndham who played an important role in the establishment of defence organisation in the West Country against the threat of Spanish invasion.

As a young officer, then-Captain (Guards officers held 'double' rank, so a Captain was also a Lieutenant-Colonel) Henry Wyndham fought at the Battle of Waterloo in 1815, where he was severely injured. He had taken part in the famous closing of the gates at Hougoumont and was said to have been so disturbed by the incident that he would never again close a door, preferring to sit in a room in a howling draught.  During the battle, his life had been saved by Corporal James Graham, the soldier responsible for slotting the bar home after the North Gate was shut.

Pictures of the battles of Battle of Vittoria and Waterloo were commissioned by Wyndham's father from George Jones, RA. They hang in the Beauty Room of Petworth House.

References 

ThePeerage.com

External links 
 

1790 births
1860 deaths
11th Hussars officers
British Army generals
British Army personnel of the Napoleonic Wars
Conservative Party (UK) MPs for English constituencies
Knights Commander of the Order of the Bath
People from Petworth
UK MPs 1852–1857
UK MPs 1857–1859
UK MPs 1859–1865
Younger sons of earls
Coldstream Guards officers
Henry